Father Judge High School is a Roman Catholic high school in Philadelphia, Pennsylvania, United States. The Oblates of St. Francis de Sales run the school, which the Roman Catholic Archdiocese of Philadelphia established in 1954.

History 
The school is named for Father Thomas Augustine Judge (1868–1933), who organized lay missionaries in the northeastern United States. Fr. Judge founded the congregation of sisters whose "motherhouse" is located next to the high school; these sisters then donated a portion of the land to the archdiocese on which the school was built.

Admissions

Demographics

Curriculum 
The school offers ten Advanced Placement classes for sophomore, junior, and senior students: U.S. Government & Politics, English Language and Composition, Literature, Calculus, European History, U.S. History, Psychology, Physics, Environmental Science, and Biology.

Extracurricular activities

Father Judge Model United Nations Team

 UNA-USA Model United Nations Conference 1st place (1999, 2002, 2006, 2007, 2008 (only school to have won this title in back to back to back seasons. Father Judge is also the only school to have won this award five times).
 North American Invitational Model United Nations 1st place (2000) and(2003)
 Honorary resolutions from both the Philadelphia City Council and Pennsylvania State Senate for their achievements in debate.

Crusader News Network
CNN ("Crusader News Network") is Father Judge's student-run network television station. Renovated in 2013–2014 with the help of several students from the class of 2014, CNN provides live announcements during homeroom via the school's YouTube Channel.

Athletics 

The school is a member of the Philadelphia Catholic League (PCL) and the Philadelphia City (now PIAA District XII).  The Athletic Department currently offers 14 interscholastic athletic programs and two club sports programs.  The athletic programs offered at Father Judge include: Soccer, Football, Golf, Cross Country, Fall Crew, Basketball, Wrestling, Bowling, Indoor Track, Baseball, Lacrosse, Outdoor Track, Tennis, Spring Crew, and club sports Ice Hockey and Rugby.  The school has participated in 59 PCL Championships and 18 City (District XII) Championships over its 60-year history, with the most recent teams of Soccer, Wrestling, and Bowling capturing their titles in the 2013–2014 season. Joe Galasso was the first wrestler from Philadelphia to win a State Title in the 138lb weight class for wrestling.

The school has two gymnasiums (The Fox Gymnasium and the Mitchell Activity Center), a wrestling training room, a weight room and fitness center, a track & athletic complex, a synthetic turf multi-purpose (football, soccer, lacrosse, rugby) field, an artificial turf baseball field, three locker rooms, and a cross country course in nearby Pennypack Park.

The school launched the Patrick S. McGonigal '81 Center for Fitness and Wellness in 2013 to offer fitness and wellness programming open to the entire student body. The center offers fitness programming, strength training, intramurals, and an Outdoor Recreation Club.

Notable alumni 
 Joe Bonikowski, baseball pitcher
 Joseph R. Cistone, bishop, diocese of Saginaw
 Jeffrey Clark, attorney
 Kyle Daukaus, mixed martial arts fighter
 Bob File, baseball pitcher
 Joe Kerrigan, baseball pitcher and manager
 Frank Legacki, swimmer and entrepreneur
 Mike McCloskey, NFL player
 Michael McGeehan, Pennsylvania House of Representatives
 John Sabatina, Pennsylvania House of Representatives

References

Boys' schools in the United States
Eastern Pennsylvania Rugby Union
Roman Catholic secondary schools in Philadelphia
Educational institutions established in 1954
1954 establishments in Pennsylvania
Northeast Philadelphia